Anna Mosenkova (born 13 June 1973) is an Estonian ice dancer. With partner Sergei Sychyov, she is the 2000-2002 Estonian national champion and competed at the World Figure Skating Championships and European Figure Skating Championships, with a highest placement of 21st at the 2000 European Figure Skating Championships. They also competed on the ISU Grand Prix of Figure Skating. They were coached by Lea Rand, the mother of Estonian ice dancers Kristian and Taavi Rand.

Before teaming up with Sychyov, Mosenkova competed with Dmitri Kurakin, with whom she medaled at nationals and competed at Worlds, Europeans, and the World Junior Figure Skating Championships.

References

External links
 Tracings.net profile

Estonian female ice dancers
1973 births
Figure skaters from Tallinn
Living people
Estonian people of Russian descent